Grant Dawson (born February 20, 1994) is an American mixed martial artist currently competing in the Lightweight division of the Ultimate Fighting Championship. As of December 19, 2022, he is #15 in the UFC lightweight rankings.

Background
Dawson was born in Cambria, Wisconsin, but grew up mostly in Stromsburg, Nebraska. Initially dreaming of football career, Dawson started wrestling to aid his primary sport. After realizing he wasn't good enough at football, he dropped the sport and concentrated solely in wrestling. He was homeschooled until his teens, and attended Cross County Community School where he competed in high school wrestling, finishing his senior season with a record of 40–8. After graduating from high school but skipping college due to dyslexia, Dawson decided to pursue a career in mixed martial arts.

Mixed martial arts career

Early career
After compiling an amateur record of 8–1, Dawson started his professional MMA career in 2014. He amassed a professional record of 11–1 prior to participating in Dana White's Contender Series.

Dana White's Contender Series
Dawson appeared on the first season of the program Dana White's Contender Series 6. He faced Adrian Diaz on August 17, 2017 and won the fight by submission due to a rear-naked choke in round two. With the win, Dawson was offered a UFC contract.

Ultimate Fighting Championship
Dawson made his UFC debut on March 9, 2019, at UFC Fight Night: Lewis vs. dos Santos against Julian Erosa. He won the fight via unanimous decision.

His next fight came on May 18, 2019, at UFC Fight Night: dos Anjos vs. Lee against Michael Trizano.  He won the fight via a rear-naked choke in round two. This win earned him the Performance of the Night award.

Dawson was scheduled to meet Chas Skelly on January 18, 2020, at UFC 246. However, Dawson was flagged by USADA the second times where the initial flagging was in November 2017 for a residual metabolite of the steroid Turinabol which it was subsequent cleared by USDADA for not able to determine when Dawson had ingested the banned substance, and that resulted in the Nevada State Athletic Commission (NSAC) pulling bout from UFC 246. The subsequent finding from USADA found no evidence of performance enhancement of a re-ingestion of a banned drug. However, NSAC would revisit the matter in July, 2020 to determine to issue Nevada fighter licence Dawson and Dawson would have to undergo testing twice a month.
The bout was rescheduled on February 29, 2020, at  UFC Fight Night: Benavidez vs. Figueiredo at Norfolk, Virginia. On February 7, 2020, it was reported that Skelly was injured during one of his training session and was forced to withdraw from the event, and he was replaced by promotional newcomer Darrick Minner. At the weigh-ins, Dawson also failed to make weight, coming in at 149.5 pounds, 3.5 pounds over the featherweight non-title limit of 146 pounds. He was fined 30% of his fight purse, which went to Minner and the bout proceeded at a catchweight. Dawson won the fight via a submission in round two.

Dawson faced Nad Narimani on July 19, 2020, at UFC Fight Night: Figueiredo vs. Benavidez 2. He won the fight via unanimous decision.

Dawson faced Leonardo Santos on March 20, 2021, at UFC on ESPN 21. He won the fight via knockout in round three. This win earned him the Performance of the Night award.

Grant was scheduled to face Carlos Diego Ferreira on October 2, 2021, at UFC Fight Night 193. However, Ferreira pulled out of the fight in early-September citing an injury. Instead Dawson faced Rick Glenn on October 23, 2021, at UFC Fight Night 196. The fight ended in majority draw.

Grant, replacing Rafael Alves, faced Jared Gordon on April 30, 2022, at UFC on ESPN 35. He won the bout via rear-naked choke late into the third round.

Grant faced Mark Madsen, replacing Drakkar Klose, November 5, 2022, at UFC Fight Night 214. At the weigh-ins, Dawson weighed in at 157.5 pounds, one and a half pounds over the lightweight non-title fight limit. His bout is expected to proceed at catchweight and he will be fined 30% of his individual purse, which will go to his opponent  Madsen. He won the fight via a rear-naked choke submission in the third round.

Championships and accomplishments

Mixed martial arts
Ultimate Fighting Championship
Performance of the Night (Two times)

Mixed martial arts record

|-
|Win
|align=center|19–1–1
|Mark Madsen
|Submission (rear-naked choke)
|UFC Fight Night: Rodriguez vs. Lemos
|
|align=center|3
|align=center|2:04
|Las Vegas, Nevada, United States
|
|-
|Win
|align=center|18–1–1
|Jared Gordon
|Submission (rear-naked choke)
|UFC on ESPN: Font vs. Vera
|
|align=center|3
|align=center|4:11
|Las Vegas, Nevada, United States
|
|-
|Draw
|align=center|
|Ricky Glenn
|Draw (majority)
|UFC Fight Night: Costa vs. Vettori
|
|align=center|3
|align=center|5:00
|Las Vegas, Nevada, United States
|
|-
|Win
|align=center|17–1
|Leonardo Santos
|KO (punches)
|UFC on ESPN: Brunson vs. Holland
|
|align=center|3
|align=center|4:59
|Las Vegas, Nevada, United States
|
|-
|Win
|align=center|16–1
|Nad Narimani
|Decision (unanimous)
|UFC Fight Night: Figueiredo vs. Benavidez 2
|
|align=center|3
|align=center|5:00
|Abu Dhabi, United Arab Emirates
|
|-
|Win
|align=center|15–1
|Darrick Minner
|Submission (rear-naked choke)
|UFC Fight Night: Benavidez vs. Figueiredo
|
|align=center|2
|align=center|1:38
|Norfolk, Virginia, United States
|
|-
|Win
|align=center|14–1
|Michael Trizano
|Submission (rear-naked choke)
|UFC Fight Night: dos Anjos vs. Lee
|
|align=center|2
|align=center|2:27
|Rochester, New York, United States
|
|-
|Win
|align=center|13–1
|Julian Erosa
|Decision (unanimous)
|UFC Fight Night: Lewis vs. dos Santos
|
|align=center|3
|align=center|5:00
|Wichita, Kansas, United States
|
|-
|Win
|align=center|12–1
|Adrian Diaz
|Submission (rear-naked choke)
|Dana White's Contender Series 1
|
|align=center|2
|align=center|1:15
|Las Vegas, Nevada, United States
|
|-
|Win
|align=center|11–1
|Mike Plazola
|Submission (triangle choke)
|Kansas City Fighting Alliance 20
|
|align=center|1
|align=center|3:49
|Independence, Missouri, United States
|
|-
|Win
|align=center|10–1
|Christian Camp
|TKO (elbows and punches)
|VFC 52
|
|align=center|2
|align=center|1:43
|Omaha, Nebraska, United States
|
|-
|Loss
|align=center|9–1
|Hugh Pulley
|TKO (punches)
|Kansas City Fighting Alliance 18
|
|align=center|1
|align=center|0:35
|Independence, Missouri, United States
|
|-
|Win
|align=center|9–0
|Robert Washington
|TKO (punches)
|Titan FC 37
|
|align=center|2
|align=center|2:08
|Ridgefield, Washington, United States
|
|-
|Win
|align=center|8–0
|Bryce Logan
|TKO (punches)
|Victory Fighting Championship 47
|
|align=center|2
|align=center|3:12
|Omaha, Nebraska, United States
|
|-
|Win
|align=center|7–0
|Andrew Carrillo
|Submission (rear-naked choke)
|rowspan=2|Kansas City Fighting Alliance 15
|rowspan=2|
|align=center|1
|align=center|3:21
|rowspan=2|Grandview, Missouri, United States
|
|-
|Win
|align=center|6–0
|Danny Tims
|Submission (rear-naked choke)
|align=center|1
|align=center|4:15
|
|-
|Win
|align=center|5–0
|Chris McDaniel
|Submission (rear-naked choke)
|ShoFight: Branson Brawl
|
|align=center|1
|align=center|4:07
|Branson, Missouri, United States
|
|-
|Win
|align=center|4–0
|James Smith
|Submission (rear-naked choke)
|Victory Fighting Championship 45
|
|align=center|1
|align=center|2:30
|Ralston, Nebraska, United States
|
|-
|Win
|align=center|3–0
|Adam Rider
|Submission (rear-naked choke)
|Shamrock FC: Heavy Artillery
|
|align=center|1
|align=center|1:45
|Kansas City, Missouri, United States
|
|-
|Win
|align=center|2–0
|Matt Williams
|Submission (armbar)
|DCS 12
|
|align=center|1
|align=center|2:29
|Lincoln, Nebraska, United States
|
|-
|Win
|align=center|1–0
|Jeremiah Denson
|Submission (rear-naked choke)
|Omaha Fight Club 100
|
|align=center|2
|align=center|2:29
|Omaha, Nebraska, United States
|
|-

See also
List of current UFC fighters
List of male mixed martial artists

References

External links
 
 

1994 births
Living people
American male mixed martial artists
American practitioners of Brazilian jiu-jitsu
Featherweight mixed martial artists
Lightweight mixed martial artists
Mixed martial artists utilizing wrestling
Mixed martial artists utilizing Brazilian jiu-jitsu
Ultimate Fighting Championship male fighters
American male sport wrestlers
Amateur wrestlers